The Infiniti M is a line of mid-size luxury (executive) cars from the Infiniti luxury division of Nissan. From 2013 (model year 2014) on it has been marketed as the Infiniti Q70, reflecting the company's new naming scheme.

The first iteration was the M30 Coupé/Convertible, which were rebadged JDM Nissan Leopard. After a long hiatus, the M nameplate was used for Infiniti's mid-luxury sedans (executive cars). First was the short-lived M45 sedan, a rebadged version of the Japanese-spec Nissan Gloria. The next generations, the M35/45 and M37/56/35h/30d, became the flagship of the Infiniti brand and are based on the JDM Nissan Fuga.

First generation (1989–1992) 

The Infiniti M30 was a 2-door coupé based on the Japanese market Nissan Leopard (chassis code F31). It was launched in 1989 for the 1990 model year as a less-expensive alternative to the Infiniti Q45, and was intended as a stopgap until the Infiniti J30 sedan was launched for the 1992 model year. 

Unlike its competitors that were designed with the American market in mind and were launched as brand-new models, the M30 was based on a somewhat dated platform that was originally designed for the Japanese market; when it came to America, few changes were made to the platform aside from cosmetic differences, and the M30's angular design and on-road performance were rather outdated, especially considering a redesigned Acura Legend coupe was launched in 1991. The interior, in particular, came in for criticism for its angular design and outdated ergonomics. While the Japanese-market Leopard had received a new dashboard along with the 1988 facelift, economics precluded making a left-hand-drive version of the new dashboard and the M30 was instead fitted with the LHD version of the R31 Skyline's rectilinear dashboard, first presented in 1985.

The M30 made up for these deficiencies in its somewhat lower price; whereas the 1990 Acura Legend coupe started at $27,325 before options and the 1990 BMW 325i started at $24,650 before options, the M30 started at $23,500, and had no factory options, per Infiniti's pricing structure used at the time. Dealerships offered an in-car cellular telephone and in-dash CD player as optional accessories, amongst other items.

Overview
Standard equipment on the M30 included a driver's side airbag, anti-lock brakes, an anti-theft security system with an engine immobilizer, Nissan Sonar Suspension II, and leather upholstery. Other standard equipment included a 4 speaker Nissan-Bose audio system with satellite radio controls, a cassette player and an electric mast antenna, automatic climate control, cruise control, a power moonroof, power windows, power locks, and power mirrors.

For the 1991 model year, the cable-type speedometer became electric, instrument cluster typeface changed to match that of the Q45, and fuel and coolant temperature gauges were switched. An illuminated entry feature was added that would light the driver's and passenger's door keyhole and the interior dome light upon pulling the outer door handle. Selective door lock logic was added that allowed unlocking of the passenger door from the driver's keyhole by turning the key twice. 

A convertible was introduced for the 1991 model year. All convertibles originated as coupe models, and were shipped to California and converted by American Sunroof Corporation (ASC). The electric canvas top featured fully automatic push-button operation, similar to the redesigned 1990 Mercedes-Benz SL, although the SL used a hydraulic system, while the M30 used an electric system. Unlike the coupe, the M30 convertibles utilized manual climate controls, and a standard Active Sound audio system. As the convertible top used a plastic rear window, the rear window defrost feature used on the coupe was removed, and buttons to raise and lower the convertible top were put in place of the rear window defrost switch. The convertible model was never officially sold in Japan, and was exclusive to the US market, although convertibles have been imported to Japan in the last few years by collectors.

All 1992 models gained the addition of a central locking switch next to the Sonar Suspension II selector, and the intake plenum cover was revised and displayed the Infiniti logo, rather than the Nissan logo and the "V6 3000" script on 1990 and 1991 cars.

The M30 was discontinued after the 1992 model year following a production run of approximately 17,000 cars. It was replaced in the Infiniti lineup by the J30 sedan, which was based on the F31 Nissan Leopard's successor, the Nissan Leopard J. Ferie (chassis code Y32).

Technical 
All M30s were equipped with a Jatco RE4R01A 4-speed automatic transmission. The differential was a Nissan open R200 unit. Although most Nissan Leopards were equipped with a DOHC V6, offered in 2-liter, 3-liter, naturally aspirated, and turbocharged forms, the M30 was only offered with the SOHC VG30E. Although it was a smooth powertrain, which Infiniti touted in its brochures for the M30, the  coupe and 3,523 lb (1,598 kg) convertible were generally received as overweight and underpowered, with a quoted 0-60 time of 9.4 and 9.7 seconds, respectively. Infiniti marketed the car as a luxury sports coupe, and its relatively low power output, combined with the absence of a manual transmission, hampered its performance and sporting image.

Like the Nissan Maxima, the M30 was equipped with Nissan's Sonar Suspension II. Using a sonar sensor mounted underneath the front bumper that scanned the road surface ahead of the vehicle, it would instantly change damping based on varying road surfaces, using individual actuators on each shock absorber. A center console-mounted switch allowed drivers to choose between Comfort (soft) and Sport (firm) suspension modes.

Second generation (2002–2004) 
 
Infiniti M45 was designed in 2000 at the Nissan Technical Center (NTC) in Atsugi, Japan; was manufactured in Tochigi, Japan; and is based on eleventh generation, Y34-series Nissan Gloria.

In addition to the difference in powertrain with the Y34 Cedric/Gloria, the Y34 M45 uses a different instrument panel design, similar to the F50 Q45 as well as a different rear multi-link suspension design. The Y34 Cedric/Gloria's rear multi-link suspension design is similar to Z32 300ZX, and S14/S15 Silvia/200SX/240SX where the rear spring is mounted on the strut. The rear suspension design on the Y34 M45 is much like the rear suspension design on the Z33 350Z, where the spring is mounted independent of the shock/strut, and sits directly on the lower arm, in a spring cup.

The front suspension design carries over from the Y33 Q45, with a one-piece strut/upright. In place of the stamped steel front lower arm, the Y34 M45 has a cast aluminum lower A-arm.

The M45 broadened Nissan's use of the 4.5L V8 that had been exclusive to the Q45, allowing the company to better amortize the engine's development cost.

Third generation (2005–2010)

Infiniti released a redesigned M for the 2006 model year, released in February 2005, and marketed in Japan as the Nissan Fuga. All-wheel-drive models, marketed as the M35x and M45x, use a system (ATTESA-ETS) to send all power to the rear wheels until slip is detected. As the Q45 was no longer exported from Japan after model year 2006, the M45 became Infiniti's flagship.

The M used a more rigid version of the Nissan FM platform shared with the G35/350Z/FX — and was available with the VQ-series  3.5 L V6 in the M35, or the Q45's  4.5 L V8 in the M45. 

Reception
The automotive press the Y50 Infiniti M several praised the M35 and M45's driving involvement and handling dynamics vs the GS and E-Class while having superior ergonomics to the 5 Series; furthermore the M was equipped and priced competitively against its German rivals, while the M35 also received strong reviews. Despite entering a very crowded, competitive segment in which almost every member has been recently redesigned, the M managed to claim several key distinctions. The M is near or at the top of its class of every interior dimension, actually breaking into the United States Environmental Protection Agency "large" category depending on which option packages are selected.

 The M35x won Consumer Reports top luxury car pick for 2006, taking the top spot from the 2005 Lexus LS 430.

The Infiniti M did not gain a significant share in the mid-luxury market. The Infiniti G37 sedan and coupe, competing in the entry-level luxury sport category, accounted for half of the marque's sales as of 2009. Out of that year's 81000 Infiniti cars sold, only 10000 were of the M nameplate. Furthermore, the 2009 update left M35 and M45 in awkward positions of the Infiniti lineup, as though they were the flagships of the marque, they were out-powered by the VQ37VHR engines fitted in the 2009 G37 coupe and sedan. For that model year while the G Series received 7-speed automatic transmissions across the lineup, only the M35 RWD was upgraded to a 7-speed automatic while the rest of the nameplate retained the aging 5-speed automatic.

2008/2009 Mid-generational refresh

For the 2008 model year, the Infiniti M received a facelift, receiving optional all wheel drive (M45x), revised front and rear fascias, revised tail lights, and redesigned blue-highlted gauges, previously orange. Infiniti also offered an S type version for the M45/M45x similar to the previous Sport model. Other new features on the 2008 model include touch screen hard drive based navigation, iPod integration, and a music hard drive.

The 2009 M35x, M45, and M45x retained the five-speed automatic.

Fourth generation (2010–2019) 

The Y51, designed by Hideo Komuro during 2006 and 2008 under the supervision of Shiro Nakamura, took on a more fluid look, recalling the coke bottle styling of a 1960s and 1970s.

The 2011 Infiniti M debuted at the 59th Annual Pebble Beach Concours d'Elegance, and at a media event in Beverly Hills, California in December 2009, to coincide with the LA Auto Show in Los Angeles. The production version went on sale globally starting in the spring of 2010, as a 2011 model — and in the US on March 1, 2010. It was launched in Europe at the 2010 Geneva Motor Show.

A driving mode selector was included on all models, situated below the transmission gear lever and between the heated and ventilated front seat controls, providing four selections labeled "Standard", "Sport", "Eco", and "Snow", allowing the 7-speed transmission, engine and various systems to optimize driving in varying conditions. To minimize intrusion of exhaust noise in the passenger compartment, the M included a noise cancelling system marketed as Active Noise Control. Double-piston shock absorbers, developed by Kayaba Industry Company, have replaced those previously supplied by Hitachi.

The 5.6L V8 VK56VD in the Infiniti M56 was competitive with other V8 mid-luxury (executive) cars such as the BMW 550i and Mercedes-Benz E550. The 5.6L V8 is not shared with its Japanese domestic market counterpart, the Nissan Fuga, as Nissan opted instead to have the hybrid version as the performance option. The extended length version of the Fuga, known as the Cima, is offered as the Infiniti Q70L beginning from model year 2015.

The M37 and M56 will have all-wheel drive optional, badged as M37x and M56x, respectively.

Safety technology included Lane Departure Prevention, which uses a small camera mounted above the rearview mirror to gauge distance from the lane markers, and would lightly deploy selected brakes to help ease the car into the correct lane. It allowed for unimpeded lane changes when the turn signal is used and yields control to the driver at all times. Blind Spot Intervention System used sensors to provide a visual warning in the side view mirror. If the car sensed movement toward an obstacle, it provided an audible warning and applied opposite side brakes to guide the vehicle to the correct lane.

Safety
The third generation Infiniti M models were given a "Top Safety Pick" by the Insurance Institute for Highway Safety (IIHS) by earning a "Good" score for all four IIHS crash tests while also featuring standard stability control to help avoid accidents altogether.

Engines

M35h (Hybrid version) (2011–2019)
The Infiniti M Hybrid, to be sold as the Nissan Fuga Hybrid in Japan where it is the top performance trim there, will introduce Nissan's first in-house developed electric hybrid technology, and the carmaker claims it will double the fuel economy of its gasoline-powered version. Nissan also announced that the Nissan Infiniti/Fuga Hybrid, together with the Nissan Leaf, will include its new Vehicle Sound for Pedestrians system to alert pedestrians, the blind and others to their presence when the hybrid is operating at low speeds in all-electric mode.

The hybrid includes one electric motor and two clutches to allow the 3.5L V6 ( and ) gas engine and electric motor to drive the rear wheels simultaneously. The lithium-ion battery pack will come from the Infiniti Essence. The VQ35HR 3.5 L V6 Hybrid utilizes the Atkinson cycle. The electric motor, installed in parallel between the engine and the transmission, produces  from 1.3kWh lithium-ion batteries that are expected to have a service life of 10 years. The batteries are installed upright behind the rear seats. The main sacrifices are that the luggage compartment space is reduced, the hybrid's rear seats are fixed in place and cannot fold down, and all-wheel drive is not available. One benefit of the battery placement though, is that it leaves the hybrid with a 51/49 front to rear weight distribution.

Reviewers have considered the 2012 Infiniti M35h, along with the 2011 Porsche Panamera S Hybrid which also debuted in the same calendar year, as among the best executed hybrid performance luxury cars. The M35h and Panamera S Hybrid are the first hybrid gasoline-electric vehicles with an automatic transmission to return frugal fuel economy figures and retain the acceleration/handling characteristics of its gasoline-only counterparts. Earlier hybrids such as the Lexus 2007 GS 450h used a CVT for fuel economy at the cost of driving dynamics, while the 2010 BMW ActiveHybrid 7 which has an automatic transmission did not feature significantly improved mileage over its gasoline counterpart. The M35h's fuel economy is superior to the M37, and it is almost as fast as the M56 while providing a more balanced, near 50/50, front/rear weight distribution.

On August 23, 2011, the Infiniti M35h set an official Guinness world record for the world's fastest accelerating production full hybrid. The feat took place at the United Kingdom's Santa Pod Raceway, where CAR magazine journalist Tim Pollard drove the vehicle down the quarter-mile dragstrip in 13.896 seconds. Guinness adjudicators were present to witness the run and certify the record. The official claimed 0– time for the Infiniti M35h is 5.5 seconds.

M30d (Diesel version) (2010–2014)
In 2010, at the Geneva Motor Show, the Infiniti M was introduced with a diesel engine for the first time. It will be sold across Europe starting in September 2010. In western Europe, this V6 performance diesel will be offered as a high performance option in lieu of the M56 V8. The M30d will not be sold in the US or Canada.

Discontinuation
In 2019, Nissan confirmed that the Infiniti Q70, Q70L, Q30, and QX30 models will be discontinued after the 2019 model year due to poor sales as buyers in the United States, Canada, and Mexico preferred crossovers and SUVs instead of sedans, hatchbacks, wagons, convertibles, and coupes. Another reason for the discontinuation was Nissan's plans to withdraw the Infiniti brand from the Australian, New Zealand, South Korean, Hong Kong, Macau, Vietnamese, Indonesian, Malaysian, and West European markets by the end of 2020, with Nissan already withdrawing the Infiniti brand from the South African market in 2017 due to losses and poor sales. Nissan has no plans of abandoning sedans entirely and plans on possibly introducing an Infiniti EV vehicle in 2021 for the 2022 model year based from QS Inspiration concept.

Awards and recognition
 2010 Ward's Auto Interior of the Year
 2011 Popular Mechanics Automotive Excellence Award- "Top 10 Cars of 2011" (Top Luxury Pick).
 2011 Infiniti M received Insurance Institute for Highway Safety Top Safety Pick.
 2011 Infiniti M35h sets official Guinness record for world's fastest production hybrid (certified by the 2013 Guinness Book of Records edition)

Sales by calendar year

See also
 Infiniti

References

External links
 Official Infiniti USA site
 Official Canadian site

M45
All-wheel-drive vehicles
Cars introduced in 1989
Cars of Japan
Convertibles
Coupés
Executive cars
Flagship vehicles
Hybrid electric vehicles
Luxury vehicles
Mid-size cars
Rear-wheel-drive vehicles
Sports sedans
Vehicles with four-wheel steering